Tegea was a town of ancient Crete, which, according to legend, was founded by Agamemnon.

The editors of the Barrington Atlas of the Greek and Roman World note the tentative suggestion of its site as near modern Deliana, but ultimately leave it as unlocated.

References

Populated places in ancient Crete
Former populated places in Greece
Lost ancient cities and towns
Locations in Greek mythology